Corystidae is a family of crabs, in its own superfamily, Corystoidea. It includes what was once thought to be the oldest Eubrachyuran fossil, Hebertides jurassica, thought to be dating from the Bathonian (Middle Jurassic); the species was subsequently reinterpreted as being Cenozoic in age. Corystidae contains ten extant and five extinct species in eight genera:
Corystes Bosc, 1802
Corystites Lőrenthey, in Lőrenthey & Beurlen, 1929
Gomeza Gray, 1831
Gomezinus † Collins, Lee & Noad, 2003
Harenacorystes † Van Bakel, Jagt, Artal & Fraaije, 2009
Hebertides † Guinot, De Angeli & Garassino, 2007
Jonas Hombron & Jacquinot, 1846
Micromithrax † Noetling, 1881

References

External links

Crabs
Extant Miocene first appearances
Decapod families
Taxa named by George Samouelle